Dublje can refer to:

 Dublje (Bogatić), a village in Serbia
 Dublje (Svilajnac), a village in Serbia
 Dublje (Trstenik), a village in Serbia